Jim Collins (born June 19, 1956) is an American country music singer-songwriter. Between 1985 and 1998, Collins released three studio albums. Seven of his singles reached Billboard Hot Country Songs chart. The highest of these, "The Next Step," peaked at No. 55 in 1997.

As a songwriter, Collins has had 50 of his songs recorded by others, including singles performed by Kenny Chesney ("She Thinks My Tractor's Sexy", "The Good Stuff", "Everybody Wants to Go to Heaven"), Chad Brock ("Yes!"), Jason Aldean ("Big Green Tractor"), and Gretchen Wilson ("I Don't Feel Like Loving You Today") which was nominated for a Grammy Award for Best Country Song. "The Good Stuff" was Billboard Number One country single for seven weeks of 2002, and it won ASCAP song of the year.

The Thompson Square recording of "Are You Gonna Kiss Me Or Not" was nominated for a Grammy Award for Best Country Song in 2011. In 2014, Easton Corbin's performance of "Baby Be My Love Song" rose to number 3 in the US Country Airplay. In 2020, Collins was inducted into the Texas Heritage Songwriters Hall of Fame.

Discography

Albums

Singles

ACredited to Jimmy Collins.

Music videos

References

External links

1959 births
American country singer-songwriters
American male singer-songwriters
Living people
People from Nacogdoches, Texas
Singer-songwriters from Texas
Arista Nashville artists
Country musicians from Texas